The Heart of Asia – Istanbul Process (HoA-IP) is an initiative of the Republic of Afghanistan and the Republic of Turkey, which was officially launched at a conference hosted by Turkey in Istanbul on 2 November 2011. Since then, Afghanistan supported by fourteen Participating Countries of the Heart of Asia Region and 16 Supporting Countries beyond the region as well as 12 Regional and International Organizations is leading and coordinating this Process. It is a platform for promoting regional security, economic and political cooperation centered on Afghanistan through dialogue and a set of Confidence Building Measures (CBMs).

Goals of the Process
The Heart of Asia – Istanbul Process aims at promoting and strengthening peace, security, stability and prosperity in Afghanistan and in the region through confidence building and enhancing regional cooperation among 15 countries of the Heart of Asia Region.
The HoA-IP has become one of the most interactive voluntary state-groupings in the HoA Region. It brings Afghanistan's immediate and extended neighbors as well as international supporters together through the following focus areas:
Political Consultations
Implementation of the Confidence Building Measures (CBMs)
Cooperation with Regional Organizations

Chairmanship
De Facto Secretariat of the Heart of Asia – Istanbul Process:
The Directorate General for Regional Cooperation of the Ministry of Foreign Affairs of Afghanistan is acting as the de facto Secretariat of the Process.

Permanent Chair

Previous Chairs

Membership
Current Members

The Heart of Asia Region
The geographical area covering the 15 Participating Countries of the HoA-IP is defined as the Heart of Asia Region. It is one of the biggest regions in the world with a collective geographical area of more than 40 million km2 covering around 27% of the land area of the Earth.

Areas of cooperation in the Heart of Asia – Istanbul Process

The Heart of Asia – Istanbul Process is based on three main areas of cooperation: Political Consultations, Confidence Building Measures, and Cooperation with Regional Organizations.

Political consultations

Political consultations are an important step towards building confidence and generating regional consensus and coherence. This is an intrinsic ingredient of regional cooperation to bring the HoA-IP Participating Countries and stakeholders together around a set of common regional interests and to foster understanding.An Increase in coherent regional political consultations has the potential to strengthen genuine cooperation in the Heart of Asia Region.
The Process has identified regional political consultation as its primary element to bring Afghanistan, its near and extended neighbors around the table. In fact, the Process has generated a new momentum of regional cooperation in the Heart of Asia Region and has made progress in creating a sense of interconnectedness between the region and Afghanistan.
Most of political obstacles and barriers in the implementation of major regional economic projects, are addressed through this mechanism by finding common grounds that could ensure mutual interests of the Heart of Asia Region, as well as explore new opportunities and areas of cooperation.

Confidence Building Measures (CBMs) and lead countries
Regional cooperation requires the identification of areas of common interests. The Heart of Asia – Istanbul Process has the following eight different CBMs (one under development) in which one or more than one Participating Country/ies of the Process has/have the lead:
1. Counter Terrorism (CT): Led by Afghanistan, Turkey and [the United Arab Emirates].
2. Counter Narcotics (CN): Led by [Azerbaijan] and [Russia].
3. Disaster Management and Environmental Protection (DM&EP): Led by Kazakhstan and Pakistan. In the Eighth Ministerial Conference of the HoA-IP held in Istanbul 2019, it was decided to include the new theme of Environmental Protection to this CBM and rename it to Disaster Management and Environmental Protection CBM. The co-chairs for the year 2020 were mandated to amend the Implementation Plan for this new CBM, which is under development at the moment.
4. Culture and Education (CE): Led by Iran.
5. Regional Infrastructure (RI): Led by [Azerbaijan] and [Turkmenistan].
6. Trade, Commerce and Investment Opportunities (TCIO): Led by [India].
7. Agriculture Development (AD): Led by Pakistan and [Uzbekistan]. Approved in [Azerbaijan] 2017 and endorsed in Istanbul 2019.
8. Women Empowerment (WE): The Foreign Ministers of the Participating Countries approved in [Istanbul] 2019 to establish a new CBM of Women Empowerment. The co-chairs for the year 2020 were mandated to develop an Implementation Plan for this new CBM, which is under development at the moment.
These CBMs promote regional dialogue and cooperation within the Heart of Asia Region. Each CBM has one or more lead country/ies that coordinate/s the activities and keep/s track of the progress made in each of these areas. Each CBM also has a desk within the Directorate General for Regional Cooperation of the Ministry of Foreign Affairs of Afghanistan and designated persons acting as focal points to follow up with the lead country as well as other Participating Countries along with Supporting Countries and Organizations.

Cooperation with regional organizations
For enhancement of current efforts in the region, the Heart of Asia – Istanbul Process works in close cooperation with Regional Processes and Organizations in order to create synergy between the Regional Organizations, supplement each other's efforts and avoid duplicity through promoting complementarity.

Implementation Plans (IPs) of the Confidence Building Measures (CBMs)
Each CBM of the Process has an Implementation Plan (IP), which outlines the priority areas and projects under that specific CBM where the Participating Countries could further enhance regional cooperation by implementing those priority areas and projects. Countries and organizations can voluntaraliy participate and support the implementation of these priority areas and projects.

Decision making bodies of the Process

The Heart of Asia – Istanbul Process consists of four main decision making authorities: the Ministerial Conferences (MCs) the highest level, the Senior Officials Meetings (SOMs), Ambassadorial Meetings (AMs), and Regional Technical Groups (RTGs) Meetings.

Ministerial Conferences (MCs) 
Ministerial Conferences take place on an annual basis. The MC, inaugurated by the Presidents of Afghanistan and the host nation for the year, is a platform where the Foreign Ministers, high level representatives and delegations of the Participating and Supporting Countries along with Supporting Regional and International Organizations come together to exchange ideas on the progress of the Heart of Asia – Istanbul Process during the year and discuss ways to tackle challenges that still lie-ahead. The participants of the Ministerial Conference continue their deliberations throughout the day of the conference. By delivering their statements of support, all parties reaffirm their commitments to the Process during the MC. Further, the co-chair and host of the next MC is officially announced. Another important outcome of the MC is the annual Declaration of the HoA-IP that is developed by the Senior Officials of the Participating Countries, prior to the MC. Each Declaration highlights a set of priorities that all Participating Countries agree to follow in the year ahead. These priorities include areas for fostering dialogue, special initiatives and the emphasis on the timely implementation of the CBMs.
Following Eight Ministerial Conferences of the Heart of Asia – Istanbul Process have been held so far:
a. 2 November 2011: Istanbul, Turkey 
b. 14 June 2012: Kabul, Afghanistan 
c. 26 April 2013: Almaty, Kazakhstan 
d. 31 October 2014: Beijing, China 
e. 9 December 2015: Islamabad, Pakistan 
f. 4 December 2016: Amritsar, India 
g. 1 December 2017: Baku, Azerbaijan 
h. 9 December 2019: Istanbul, Turkey 
Based on the Istanbul Declaration of 2019, the Republic of Tajikistan is supposed to hold the ninth Ministerial Conference of the Heart of Asia – Istanbul Process in 2020.

Senior Officials Meetings (SOMs)
Senior Official Meetings are held as deemed necessary. Usually, three to four SOMs take place each year. The first SOM of the year sets the theme.
The other two SOMs are held to continue political consultations, review the progress of the CBMs and to finalize the Ministerial Declaration. Political consultations on regional issues within the Heart of Asia Region takes place during SOMs. SOMs directly influence and shape the discourse and agenda of the MC, and have decision-making authority. SOMs also serve as an important platform, where [Participating Countries], [Supporting Countries] and Regional and [International Organizations] engage with one another.

Ambassadorial Meetings (AMs)

Ambassadorial Meetings (AMs) are mostly held in Kabul. They are held on an ad hoc basis, as the Permanent Chair, Afghanistan, deems necessary. They serve as an initial consultation to highlight a set of issues that are either of particular significance or require urgent attention. AMs are held in order to have an initial discussion with the Participating Countries before taking on the issue to the Senior Officials level. AMs are also held to do some initial work on behalf of Senior Officials on a particular issue dealing with any of the CBMs.

Regional Technical Group Meetings (RTGs)
At the Regional Technical Group Meetings, technical delegates or experts of the HoA Region come together to discuss important measures needed for the successful implementation of the CBMs. According to Article 25 of the Beijing Declaration 2014, the lead countries of the CBMs should convene at least two RTGs each year. One RTG Meeting is supposed to take place within two months of each MC and the second no later than four months prior to the following MC. At the first RTG Meeting of the year, the activities for the coming year are identified and prioritized. The second RTG Meeting of the year serves to review progress.

Achievements of the Heart of Asia – Istanbul Process
Since its establishment, the Heart of Asia – Istanbul Process has demonstrated its ability to bolster consensus on the political, security and economic fronts amongst the HoA-IP Participating and Supporting Countries and Supporting Organizations. The element of political consultations, through the Ministerial Conferences, Senior Officials Meetings, and Ambassadorial Meetings, has been dynamic, inclusive, and productive. However, this element requires furtherinvigoration to become more result-oriented by addressing the obstacles to the political, security and economic cooperation.

The thematic Confidence Building Measures are major areas that offer the potential to address some of the entrenched issues that Afghanistan and the Heart of Asia Region face. In order to eliminate these obstacles, there needs to be an effective implementation of all CBMs. Effective implementations require an understanding of the dynamics and purpose of each CBM, which is why the Ministry of Foreign Affairs of the Islamic Republic of Afghanistan recently (2019) revised the Implementation Plans of all seven CBMs. The new Implementation Plans are more focused towards specific activities that the lead countries of each CBM must carry out for better cooperation in the region. It is important to note that the Regional Technical Group Meetings aim to strengthen cooperation in each CBM's thematic area and work towards implementation of activities set in the Implementation Plans.

Lastly, cooperation with regional organizations remains vital to the success of the Heart of Asia – Istanbul Process. Simultaneously, the HoA-IP can offer to serve as a focal point connecting preeminent regional organizations with each other. Furthermore, the Process can also complement the work of these regional organizations and be a platform for synergy between the regional organizations.
The Heart of Asia – Istanbul Process has achieved a great deal in the past 9 years, since its establishment. Through the three elements of Political Consultations, Confidence Building Measures, and Cooperation with Regional Organizations, the Process has served as a platform bringing countries in the Heart of Asia Region together to jointly address common challenges and realize shared interests.

Notes

References

External links
 

2011 establishments in Turkey
Regionalism (international relations)
Afghanistan–Turkey relations
Politics of Central Asia
Organizations established in 2011